Nat or Nathan Young may refer to:

 Nat Young (born 1947), Australian surfing champion
 Nat Young (American surfer) (born 1991), Californian surfer
Nathan Young, fictional character in Misfits
Nathan Young, drummer in Anberlin
 Nathan B. Young (1862–1933), American educator
 Nathan B. Young Jr (1894–1993), American lawyer, publisher, and artist
 Nathan Young (born 2002), Canadian curler
 Nathan Young-Coombes (born 2003), English footballer
 Nathan Young (curler), Canadian curler